Béranger or Beranger is a French surname that may refer to
Clara Beranger (1886–1956), American screenwriter
Christine Béranger-Goitschel (born 1944), French alpine skier
François Béranger (1937–2003), French singer
George Beranger (1893–1973), Australian actor and film director
Grégory Béranger (born 1981), French football player 
Paul Béranger, French discus thrower
Pierre-Jean de Béranger (1780–1857), French poet and songwriter

See also
Bérenger